Christina Murray (born 8 October 1989) is a Jamaican international footballer who plays as a midfielder. Her education began at Dunrobin Primary School and Excelsior High School in Kingston, Jamaica, and was completed at University of West Florida with a degree in Sports Management.

References

External links 
 

1989 births
Living people
Jamaican women's footballers
Jamaica women's international footballers
Women's association football midfielders
Knattspyrnufélag Reykjavíkur players
Jamaican expatriate women's footballers
Jamaican expatriate sportspeople in Iceland
Expatriate women's footballers in Iceland